Swoon's Son (February 13, 1953 – 1977) is an American Hall of Fame Thoroughbred racehorse. He was bred and raced by E. Gay Drake, owner of Mineola Stock Farm in Lexington, Kentucky and a charter member of the Thoroughbred Club of America.

Ridden by jockey David Erb in all but one of his twenty-two stakes race wins, Swoon's Son set track records at a sprint distance at Keeneland Race Course in Lexington and in the seven-furlong Warren Wright Memorial Handicap at Chicago's Arlington Park. As well, he set a track record at a distance of around one mile on turf and dirt at Chicago's Washington Park Race Track and at 1 1/8 miles in the Charles W. Bidwill Memorial Handicap at Hawthorne Race Course. He raced for four years from 1955 through 1958 before being retired to stud duty at Mineola Stock Farm in January 1959. Of his offspring, the most famous is the filly Chris Evert who too would become a U.S. Racing Hall of Fame inductee.

Swoon's Son died at Mineola Stock Farm in 1977 and is buried there in the farm's equine cemetery. In 2007, his racing career was honored with induction in the National Museum of Racing and Hall of Fame.

External links
 Swoon's Son's pedigree and partial racing stats

Pedigree

References

 Swoon's Son at the National Museum of Racing and Hall of Fame

1953 racehorse births
1977 racehorse deaths
Racehorses bred in Kentucky
Racehorses trained in the United States
Horse racing track record setters
United States Thoroughbred Racing Hall of Fame inductees
Thoroughbred family 12-b